Fakhr-ol-dowleh mosque  or Fakhr mosque, originally named Amin-ol-dowleh mosque, is a historic mosque in Fakhrabad street in the Shemiran Gate neighborhood, Tehran. It was designed and built by Nikolai Markov in 1949. Fakhr-ol-dowleh, daughter of Naser al-Din Shah, was the founder of the mosque and named it after her father-in-law, Amin-ol-dowleh. However, the mosque is now called Fakhr or Fakhr-ol-dowleh, after its founder.

Some minor and major changes were made to the building over the years, and some parts of it have been damaged due to the construction in the frontage of the building, and the passing of subway trains heading to and coming from the Darvazeh Shemiran Metro Station.

History 
In 1945, Fakhr-ol-dowleh, who was married to Amin-ol-dowleh junior, son of Mirza Ali Khan Amin-ol-dowleh, decided to build a mosque named after Mirza Ali Khan in front of her house. However, the name of the mosque, and the neighborhood it's located in, changed to Fakhr-ol-dowleh over time. She appointed architect Nikolai Markov, one of the most notable architects in Iran at the time, designed and built the mosque. Construction of the building took four years to complete.

On 29 December 2004, the Fakhr-ol-dowleh mosque was registered on the Iran National Heritage List.

Characteristics 
The façade of the building consists of bricks and marquetry mosaics and the half-octagonal-shaped entrance has four small minarets on each corner. The main structure consists of a cube-shaped main building with two shabestans inside. The dome of the building originally wasn't very high; the current taller dome was built in subsequent  years. Some parts of the current structure, such as the taller dome, added āina-kāris inside the mosque, and the women's section in the front yard, were added to the building later.

Damage to the building 
In January 2011, a historic building near the Fakhr-ol-dowleh mosque named the Building of Flags, considered the first apartment hotel in Iran, was due to be registered on the National Heritage List. This building was demolished before the registration in order to build a new commercial complex. Part of the construction site for the high-rise complex impinged on the front of the historic mosque, even though construction of structures higher than  adjacent to registered historic and heritage buildings is forbidden by regulations for the protection of the cultural heritage in Iran.

Also, subway trains pass under the mosque every two minutes. The tremors caused by passing trains have cracked the dome of the mosque, and some mosaics of the facade have fallen off the walls.

References 

Mosques in Tehran
Mosque buildings with domes
National works of Iran
Pahlavi Iran
1949 establishments in Iran